The Arab Basketball Confederation (ABC) is a basketball association for countries in the Arab world. It organises the Arab Basketball Championship for national teams in the men and women categories, as well as club championships.

History 
It was founded in 1956 with nine founding members: Lebanon, Tunisia, Syria, Jordan, Iraq, Tunisia, Libya, Sudan, Algeria and Egypt. The first president was Azer Ishak from Egypt and the headquarters were agreed to be Beirut in Lebanon. In 1975, the first Arab Basketball Championship for national teams was organised in Baghdad.

Presidents 

  Azer Ishak (1965–1974)
 Tony Khory (1974–1977)
   Akram Nagy (1977–1991)
   Mohamed Hassanein Omran (1991–2002)
 Telal Ben Badr Seaod (2003–2015)
  Ismail Elkarakawy (2015–present)

References 

Basketball organizations
Basketball in Asia